Tourism in Somaliland is regulated by the Somaliland's Ministry of Tourism.

History
The history of tourism in Somaliland was linked to that of Somalia, which decreased rapidly during the Somali Civil War. Since the declaration of Somaliland's independence and the establishment of a de facto legal government, stability has returned to all but the easternmost part of the country. Many tourists go to Somaliland to visit the archaeological and historical sites close to the capital, Hargeisa, and other settlements like Zeila. Natural wonders like the beaches of Berbera or the Cal Madow mountains; or for adventure tourism of being in a country that doesn't legally exist, is still technically in civil war as part of Somalia, or to say that they've been to Somalia, albeit without much of the danger found in Somalia.

Most of the travelers to Somaliland enter through Djibouti or Ethiopia, as entering via sea or Somalia are not viable options due to the Somali Civil War/Puntland-Somaliland Conflict.

Historical sites

Dhambalin – Archaeological site in Sahil region, with rock art in the Ethiopian-Arabian style showing early evidence of animal domestication.

Haylaan – Site of numerous ancient ruins and buildings. Includes the tombs of Sheikh Darod and his wife Dobira.
Laas Gaal – Complex of caves in northwestern Somaliland containing some of the earliest known rock art in the region. Its cave paintings have been estimated to date back between 9,000-3,000 BCE.
Maydh – Site of an ancient port city in the Sanaag region of Somaliland. Includes the tomb of Sheikh Isaaq.
Qa’ableh – Old town with a number of ancient burial structures. Believed to harbor the tombs of former kings from early periods of Somali history. Includes the tomb of Sheikh Harti.
Qombo'ul – Historic town in the Sanaag region. Sites include ancient ruins, buildings and structures.
Taleh – Former capital of the Dervish State. Features a large fortress complex.
Zeila – The commercial port of Avalites in antiquity, and the first capital of the medieval Adal Sultanate.

Beaches

Baathela – Berbera

Waterfalls
Lamadaya

Mountain ranges

Cal Madow
Golis Mountains
Ogo Mountains

National parks

Daallo Mountain
Hargeisa National Park

See also

Somalian architecture
Somaliland passport
Transport in Somalia
Maritime history of Somalia
Visa policy of Somaliland

 
+Somaliland